The 2017 Bord na Móna Walsh Cup was the 55th staging of the Walsh Cup since its establishment in 1954. Kilkenny won their 20th title after a 0-20 to 0-18 win against Galway in the final on 5 February.

Format

16 teams competed: 11 county teams from Leinster, Ulster and Connacht (Antrim, Carlow, Dublin, Galway, Kildare, Kilkenny, Laois, Meath, Offaly, Westmeath and Wexford) and five third-level colleges (DCU Dóchas Éireann, DIT, IT Carlow, NUI Galway and UCD).

Group Stage

The teams are drawn into four groups of four teams. Each team plays the other teams in its group once, earning 2 points for a win and 1 for a draw.

Knockout Stage

The four group winners progress to the semi-finals.

Group stage

Group 1

Group 2

Group 3

Group 4

Knockout stage

Semi-finals

Final

References

External links
The Bord Na Mona Walsh Cup S.H. 2017

Walsh
Walsh Cup (hurling)